Aleksandr Nikolayevich Tkachov (born 23 December 1960) is a Russian politician who has served as Minister of Agriculture of Russia in Dmitry Medvedev's Cabinet from April 2015 to May 2018. Previously he was Governor of Krasnodar Krai in the southern European part of Russia from 2001 to 2015.

Biography
Tkachov was born in 1960 in Vyselki, Krasnodar Krai. He was elected to Krasnodar Krai's legislative assembly in 1994. Subsequently, he was elected to the State Duma of Russia in 1995 and re-elected in 1999. He was elected as Governor of Krasnodar Krai on 3 December 2000, and was re-elected on 14 March 2004. He is a graduate of the Krasnodar Polytechnic Institute. The Financial Times describes him as one of Vladimir Putin's "most loyal lieutenants".

Tkachyov has been an advocate for building a dam across the Kerch Strait, between Krasnodar Krai and Ukraine.  Tkachyov is also known for his strong stand against illegal immigration in Russia. Some commentators interpret his remarks as racist, particularly against the Meskhetian Turks.

Tkachyov has vowed to drive "the aliens and dissenters" out of his region.

In 2008, he made headlines when he expressed his frustration about the progress of the construction projects for the 2014 Sochi Olympics. Arguing that construction bosses and local politicians were "careless" and "indifferent" about the task ahead, he warned that the successful Olympics bid may be transferred to another part of Russia if no significant changes were made, which would result in the region foregoing a large economic opportunity.

On 2 August 2012, Tkachyov announced plans to deploy a paramilitary force of Cossacks in Krasnodar Krai beginning in September 2012 as vigilantes to discourage internal immigration by Muslim Russians. In a speech to police he stated, "What you can't do, the Cossacks can. We have no other way — we shall stamp it out, instill order; we shall demand paperwork and enforce migration policies."

On July 26, 2014, the European Union, Albania, Iceland, Liechtenstein, Moldova, Montenegro, Norway, and Ukraine added Tkachev to their sanctions lists. 

On 22 April 2015, Vladimir Putin named him as the Minister of Agriculture in Dmitry Medvedev's Cabinet, replacing Nikolay Fyodorov, who was promoted to work in the Administration of the President of the Russian Federation.

In October 2017, Putin laughed off his proposal of exporting pork to Indonesia during a cabinet meeting, a predominantly Muslim country where people do not consume pork. Putin explained to the minister that "Indonesia is a Muslim country hence its people do not eat pork." Tkachov replied “they will.” Putin then said: “No, they will not.” Later he burst into laughter and Tkachov clarified that he meant South Korea rather than Indonesia. Contrary to Putin's remarks, pork is widely consumed by more than 34 million non-Muslim Indonesians. Indonesia imported more than one million tons of pork in 2017.

Awards and honours
In 2014, Tkachov was awarded the Paralympic Order.

Photos

References

External links 

No opponent in re-election bid

1960 births
United Russia politicians
21st-century Russian politicians
Governors of Krasnodar Krai
Agriculture ministers of Russia
Our Home – Russia politicians
20th-century Russian politicians
People from Vyselkovsky District
Living people
Recipients of the Paralympic Order
Second convocation members of the State Duma (Russian Federation)
Third convocation members of the State Duma (Russian Federation)
Russian individuals subject to European Union sanctions